Galina Sergeyevna Vishnevskaya-Sheporenko (born 10 February 1994) is a Kazakhstani biathlete. She competed at the 2014 Winter Olympics in Sochi, in the women's individual and sprint competitions.

References

External links

1994 births
Living people
Biathletes at the 2014 Winter Olympics
Biathletes at the 2018 Winter Olympics
Biathletes at the 2022 Winter Olympics
Kazakhstani female biathletes
Olympic biathletes of Kazakhstan
Biathletes at the 2012 Winter Youth Olympics
Asian Games medalists in biathlon
Biathletes at the 2017 Asian Winter Games
Medalists at the 2017 Asian Winter Games
Asian Games gold medalists for Kazakhstan
Universiade medalists in biathlon
Universiade gold medalists for Kazakhstan
Universiade silver medalists for Kazakhstan
Competitors at the 2015 Winter Universiade
Competitors at the 2017 Winter Universiade
People from Semipalatinsk Oblast
Kazakhstani people of Russian descent
Sportspeople from Semey